In an auction, bid shading is the practice of a bidder placing a bid that is below what they believe a bid is worth.

Bid shading is used for one of two purposes.  In a common value auction with incomplete information, bid shading is used to compensate for the winner's curse.  In such auctions, the good is worth the same amount to all bidders, but bidders don't know the value of the good and must independently estimate it.  Since all bidders value the good equally, the winner will generally be the bidder whose estimate of the value is largest.  But if we assume that in general bidders estimate the value accurately, then the highest bidder has overestimated the good's value and will end up paying more than it is worth.  In other words, winning the auction carries bad news about a bidder's value estimate.  A savvy bidder will anticipate this, and reduce their bid accordingly.

Bid shading is also used in first-price auctions, where the winning bidder pays the amount of his bid.  If a participant bids an amount equal to their value for the good, they would gain nothing by winning the auction, since they are indifferent between the money and the good.  Bidders will optimize their expected value by accepting a lower chance of winning in return for a higher payoff if they win.

In a first-price common value auction, a savvy bidder should shade for both of the above purposes.

Bid shading is not only a normative theoretical construct, it was detected in the above-mentioned real world auction markets. Previous theoretical work on sequential auctions focused either on bid shading in an exogenous sequence of auctions, or on strategic auctioning to short-lived buyers, who never want to shade their bids. This paper provides the first model of a sequential auction with both endogenous strategic selling and forward-looking longer-lived buyers who can shade their bids. The model’s contribution is the analysis of the best response of the seller to strategic bid shading, and the exposition of a market equilibrium, in which bidders do not always shade. The most related model of bidding is Jeitschko (1999), who finds that relatively to exogenous and certain future supply, exogenous but uncertain future supply leads to a proportional bid increase. In contrast, high-valuation bidders shade more than low valuation bidders here. The most related model of optimal sequential auctioning by Vulcano, van Ryzin, and Maglaras (2002) (VRM), who study a monopolist selling to unit-demand strategic buyers who each only lives for one period. While VRM’s bidders do not shade their bids by assumption, strategic sequential auctioning has an effect on their bidding strategy because they are forward-looking: there is an incentive to overbid and make the seller sell more units in the current period than would be optimal for her.

See also 
 Jump bidding

References 

Bidding strategy